Jean-Noël Barrot (born 13 May 1983) is a French politician of the Democratic Movement (MoDem) who has served as Minister for Digital Transition and Telecommunications in the government of Prime Minister Élisabeth Borne since 2022.

Prior to joining the government, Barrot represented the 2nd constituency of the Yvelines department in the National Assembly from 2017 to 2022. He was elected to Parliament under the banner of La République En Marche! (LREM).

Early life and career
Barrot is the son of politician Jacques Barrot (1937–2014). He graduated from HEC Paris in 2007 and 2013. He also graduated from Sciences Po and the Paris School of Economics in 2008. His sister Héléne Barrot is Direction of communication for Uber in Europe.

In 2013, Barrot became an assistant professor of finance at the Sloan School of Management. In 2017, he became an assistant professor.

Political career

Career in local politics
Barrot served in the Departmental Council of Haute-Loire for the canton of Yssingeaux from 2015 to 2017, a position his father had held until 2004. In the 2021 regional election, he was elected to the Regional Council of Île-de-France on the La République En Marche! list led by Laurent Saint-Martin.

Member of Parliament, 2017–2022
In the 2017 legislative election, Barrot was elected to Parliament. In Parliament, he served as a member (and vice president) of the Finance Committee. In this capacity, he co-authored with Bénédicte Peyrol draft legislation in 2018 to combat large-scale tax evasion and avoidance schemes through dividend stripping in the wake of the CumEx Files revelations.

In addition to his committee assignments, Barrot was a member of the French-Uruguayan Parliamentary Friendship Group.

In late 2017, Barrot was appointed by President of the National Assembly François de Rugy to chair a 10-member working group on reforming the National Assembly. The group submitted two reports, in 2017 and 2018, respectively.

From February 2018, Barrot served as spokesman of the Democratic Movement, in tandem with Sarah El Haïry. He eventually succeeded Yann Wehrling as Secretary General of MoDem in December 2018, serving under the leadership of the party's president François Bayrou.

Political positions
In June 2020, Barrot together with fellow party member Patrick Mignola proposed a law to introduce mail-in voting to facilitate voting during the public health crisis caused by the COVID-19 pandemic in France.

References

1983 births
Living people
Deputies of the 15th National Assembly of the French Fifth Republic
Democratic Movement (France) politicians
La République En Marche! politicians
Politicians from Paris
HEC Paris alumni
Sciences Po alumni
Paris School of Economics alumni
French economists
Departmental councillors (France)
Members of the Regional Council of Île-de-France
Massachusetts Institute of Technology staff
Members of the Borne government
Members of Parliament for Yvelines